Carimagua Airport  is an airport serving the village of Carimagua in the Meta Department of Colombia.

The Carimauga non-directional beacon (Ident: CRG) is located on the field.

See also

Transport in Colombia
List of airports in Colombia

References

External links
OpenStreetMap - Carimagua
OurAirports - Carimagua
FallingRain - Carimagua Airport

Airports in Colombia